Kantara is the soundtrack album to the 2022 film of the same name, written and directed by Rishab Shetty, and stars himself in the lead role. Produced by Hombale Films, the film features music composed by B. Ajaneesh Loknath, who described it as a "culture-based folklore film in musical context" and wanted the music to be "rooted in the traditions of the 1990s". To attempt, what the crew had envisioned, both the film score and original songs were composed using folk instruments and folk musicians were roped in for the songs.

Kantara's soundtrack was preceded by the single track "Singara Siriye" released on 15 August 2022. The five-track album was released after the film's theatrical release, on 12 October 2022, with a sixth track being added as the bonus song. The dubbed soundtracks were released on 24 October. The music received positive critical response, praising the instrumentation and setting in tune to the ethnicity and tradition of Tulu Nadu regions.

Development 
Shetty decided to bring the folk music as an integral part of the script while writing, whereas Loknath added that the music in the film is different for other films he had composed. He brought in nearly 30–40 musicians, with approximately 10 musicians in a group resided during Kundapur, and all the songs were recorded at an open-air theatre in Mangalore, while multiple music groups who play instruments such as Koraga's Dollu, Huli Kunitha Dollu, Thase, Nadaswaram and Chanda performed the music, so as to give importance to the folk music in Tulu Nadu.

Nearly 40 hours of recording were used for the film's background score, for which Loknath excited him more than the songs, as "there is immense scope for experimentation". He combined flute with dollu instrument, so that the sound of dollu would dominate the flute music, and also used Australian tribal instrument didgeridoo which served as the "key in producing the scream-like sound" which was enriched by blending with kazoo. For the Daiva dance, he used Damaru and gaggara, and also hired noted sound recordists Arun and Shine to capture and produce that sound.

The folk instruments was then fused and programmed into the western music to elevate the cinematic experience. Especially, in the song "Varahaa Roopam" where Loknath infused carnatic classical music, folk and western rock; the classical music is composed using Todi, Varali and Mukhari ragas. The rock music was used during the Buta Kola portion, to intensify that scene were "Ravana shows his intense bhakti towards Shiva". He adapted the throat singing concept (used in Tibetan Buddhism) in the score, as Loknath said "When Guliga daiva enters into Shiva, the protagonist, I have employed this concept to bring in the religiosity. Though this is a foreign element, I ensured it doesn’t harm the authenticity of the practice." The team took guidance from Mime Ramdas, by which folklore music being represented using Jaanapada songs and traditional instruments. Songs that were popular among the Adivasis were used as a part of the album and score.

Release 
The only song to be released as a single prior to the film, was "Singara Siriye" written by Pramod Maravanthe and sung by Vijay Prakash and Ananya Bhat, released on Independence Day (15 August 2022). The music video, which released after the film, featured veteran Yakshagana artiste Nagraj Panar Valtur in the opening of the song, and was known for the Kundapura folk songs sung by women. Shetty wanted Naga to sing a song around winnowing and the tune was sent to Loknath, who blended it into the song. He added "The shooting for the song has taken place in the roads of my hometown, and I have a lot of memories connected with every street. All of this is brought out in the love track."

The full soundtrack was released after the film, by Hombale Films on 12 October 2022 to digital streaming providers, featuring all the tracks as heard in the film. Excluding one song —  the Tulu version of "Vaa Poruluya", being added to the album as a bonus song on 18 October. The Hindi, Telugu, Tamil and Malayalam dubbed versions of the soundtrack were released on 24 October 2022.

Reception 
The music received critical praise for the composition and instrumentation, which captured the ethnicity of folklore and the traditions. The Hindu's Muralidhara Kajane said that Loknath's music represents the ethos of the land. India Today's Janani K and The Times of India's Sridevi S called the music as "explosive" and "soothing". Calling his score as "marvellous", A Sharadhaa of Cinema Express "While his folk melodies are soothing, the background score accentuates the narrative of Kantara."

Track listing

Controversy 
Although the music was critically well received, Rishab Shetty and the production house Hombale Films were accused for copyright infringement as the song "Varaha Roopam" was lifted from the tune of "Navarasam" from Thaikkudam Bridge's eponymous album released in 2015. In 28 October 2022, the Kerala High Court claimed that song could not be used without obtaining permission from Thaikkudam Bridge, thereby instructing them to stop playing the song in theatres and streaming platforms, and on that November, the song video was removed from YouTube. During the digital premiere of the film in Amazon Prime Video on 24 November 2022, the song was replaced with a newer version of the track, with the tune being changed. This led to criticism from a section of fans, as they believed that it took away "the soul of the film" and initiated to restore the original version. A day after its premiere, the Kerala Lower court dismissed Thaikkudam Bridge's plea citing lack of jurisdiction. The Copyright claim and the injunction was altogether dismissed by the High Court on 1 Dec 2022 and the original song was returned to all the platforms.

References 

2022 soundtrack albums
Kannada film soundtracks